Derwent (formerly the "Cumberland Pencil Company") is a brand of pencils, art materials, and other stationery. The business began in 1832 in Cumberland under the name of "Banks, Son & Co". The company was bought by US corporation ACCO Brands (known then as Rexel) in 1980, and became a brand of their product range.

History
Keswick remained well known for producing the finest pencils in the world. Previously the pencils had been made by hand in small workshops, but in 1832, the first pencil factory in the area was opened by 'Banks, Son & Co'. This company passed through several hands before becoming the "Cumberland Pencil Company" in 1916.

Pencil range
Derwent colour pencils have traditionally been sold in tins of 12, 24, 36 and 72 different colours. They are also available in a range of wooden presentation boxes or sets of six which are intended to be trial packs.

Derwent's oldest line of colour pencils, Artist, were expanded from a range of 24 to 72 in 1939 and from 72 colours to 120 in 1996. Studio and Watercolour pencils are still available in the 72 original colours. Pastel pencils were introduced in 1994 and come in 90 colours. Derwent also now manufactures ordinary stick pastels.

Derwent Signature was a range of lightfast pencils, available in 60 colours (Signature Watercolour pencils came in 40 colours) but it was discontinued after a few years. New 72 colour ranges include Derwent Coloursoft and Derwent Inktense pencils. Derwent also produces a range of graphite pencils such as Graphitone and Graphitint (a water-soluble colour pigment and graphite mix) and charcoal pencils like Tinted Charcoal as well as special-purpose items such as Aquatone, a range of 24 sticks of pure watersoluble colour. Derwent also created a waterbrush, which houses water in the barrel of a pen which is supplied to a fibre brush via a valve, giving a constant flow of water when the brush meets paper.

Derwent have continued their innovation by launching pencils ranges including Lightfast and Procolour, plus moving into adjacent categories such as paint with the launch of the Inktense Paint Pan Travel Set in 2018.

Awards
Derwent was awarded the Queen's Awards for Enterprise.
In 2014 Derwent was awarded the Environmental & Energy Awareness Award at the local CN Business Awards.

Pencil Museum

The Derwent Pencil Museum is the focus of Derwent, and is located in Keswick. A tour is provided by the museum, which shows the history of pencil making and the creation of Derwent pencils.

References

External links
 

Art materials brands
Watercolor brands
ACCO Brands
Manufacturing companies of the United Kingdom
1832 establishments in England
Manufacturing companies established in 1832
British companies established in 1832
Stationers of the United Kingdom